Pseudophilautus rugatus, known as Farnland shrub frog, is an extinct species of frog in the family Rhacophoridae.

It was endemic to Sri Lanka.

References

rugatus
Endemic fauna of Sri Lanka
Extinct amphibians
Amphibian extinctions since 1500
Frogs of Sri Lanka
Amphibians described in 1927
Taxonomy articles created by Polbot